Laevilitorina granum is a species of sea snail, a marine gastropod mollusk in the family Littorinidae, the winkles or periwinkles.

Description

Distribution
Laevilitornia granum is commonly found in the Western Atlantic Ocean.

References

https://www.sealifebase.ca/summary/Laevilitorina-granum.html

Littorinidae
Gastropods described in 1886